Doreward's Hall is a partly brick and partly timber-framed and plastered house in Bocking, Essex, England. The house is said to have been rebuilt by Edward Thursby in 1579, but may be of earlier date; the date, 1572, on the southwest end of the West wing is said not to be original. It has been modified a number of times since then. It was designated a Grade II* Listed Building in 1951.

Description 
Doreward's Hall, about 700 yards south-southeast of the church, is of two storeys; the walls are partly of brick and partly of plastered timberframing; the roofs are tiled. The house is said to have been rebuilt by Edward Thursby in 1579, but may be of earlier date; the date, 1572, on the southwest end of the West wing is said not to be original; the West wing was probably the North wing of Thursby's house, and is the only part of it which remains. Early in the 17th century an addition was made on the east side, and there are 18th-century or modern additions at the east end and on the north side of the original wing. The plan is now of very irregular form.

The southwest end of the original wing is an interesting example of 16th-century work, and, inside the house, an early 17th-century overmantel is noteworthy.

The southwest end of the original wing is built of brick with plastered dressings, and has, at the angles, octagonal buttresses terminating in pinnacles above the parapet; the storeys are divided by moulded string-courses, and the plinth and coping of the gable are also moulded; on the ground floor is an original square-headed window of three transomed lights, surmounted by a moulded pediment, which has the date 1572 in the plastered tympanum; on the first floor is a similar window of five lights, with a defaced inscription in the tympanum; in the gable is a three-light transomed window with a moulded label; it is now blocked. The original central chimney-stack of the 16th-century wing has three octagonal shafts on a rectangular base with a moulded capping. At the west end of the 17th-century wing is a contemporary chimney-stack with attached shafts, divided by sunk panels.

Interior—Several rooms have stop-chamfered ceiling-beams and exposed joists. On the ground-floor, in the original wing, the southwest room has a wall covered with early 17th-century panelling, and the window has old iron casement-fasteners; some similar panelling has been re-used on the staircase.

In the 18th-century wing the ceiling-beams are probably re-used material of earlier date, as are two brackets, each carved only on one side. In the 17th-century wing the kitchen has a wide fireplace with a moulded lintel which has carved stops. On the first floor, in the original wing, the northeast room has one wall covered with early 17th-century panelling, and the overmantel of the same date has three arched panels divided by fluted pilasters; the frieze is also panelled, and in the middle panel is an inlaid shield of Thursby of six quarters; one of the doors is original and both the doors have old cock's-head hinges. In the 17th-century wing the room over the kitchen has a wall covered with contemporary panelling, re-used and painted.

In 1916 its condition was good, the plaster defective.

History 
The house dates from 1579 or earlier.

The building was designated a Grade II* listed building on 25 October 1951.

Thomas Wright and W. Bartlett wrote in 1831 that: Dorewards  has  the  mansion  pleasantly situated  on  an  acclivity,  with  a  fine  open  prospect  southward: it  is  a  short  distance  eastward  from  the  church,  near  the  road  from  High  Garret  to  Braintree,  and  was new-built  by  Edward  Thorsby,  in  1579. This  manor  was  holden  of  the  paramount manor  by  fealty  and  rent.Robert  de  Bocking held  this  possession  in  the  reign  of  king  John  and  Henry  the third:  his  son,  Osbert,  was  the  father  of  Richard,  from  whom,  in  1316,  the  estate  was conveyed  to  Ralph,  son  of  Roger  Doreward,  of  Bocking.

Alwine  Doreward  was  the  father  of  Thomas  and  Roger,  who  lived  in  this  parish  in  the  time  of  Henry  III (reigned 1216–1272); of  these,  the  former  was  the  father  of  Ralph,  the  purchaser  of  this  estate;  his  two  wives  were  named  Cicely  and  Agnes:  by  the  first  of these  he  had  William  and  Roger,  of  whom  William  was  his  successor;  who,  by  his wife  Joan,  only  daughter  and  heiress  of  John  Olivers,  of  Stanway,  had  John Doreward;  who had,  by  his  wife  Katharine,  a  son  and  successor  of  the  same  name,  born  in  1390;  he had  also  Joan,  married  to  Richard  Waldegrave:  Eleanor,  wife  of  Thomas Knyvett (d.1458) of Stanway Essex, Esq., the grandson of Sir John Knyvett, and  Elizabeth,  married  to Chamberlain.  Having  made  great  additions  to  his patrimonial  estate,  he  died  in  1420.  John  Doreward,  the  son,  acquired  celebrity  in the  legal  profession;  was  speaker  of  the  house  of  commons  in  1414,  and  sheriff  of Essex  and  Hertfordshire  in  1425  and  1432.  He  married  Blanche,  eldest  daughter  of Sir  William  de  Coggeshall,  by  whom  he  had  John,  William,  Richard,  Ralph,  and Elizabeth.  On  his  decease,  in  1462,  he,  by  will,  divided  his  extensive  possessions among  his  children.  John,  the  eldest  son,  married  Anne,  daughter  and  co-heiress  of Thomas  Urswick,  Esq.  by  whom  he  had  John,  who  succeeded  his  father  on  his  death in  1476,  and  who,  dying  in  1480,  without  issue,  was  succeeded  by  his  uncle,  William Doreward,  Esq.  who  married  Margery,  eldest  daughter  and  co-heiress  of  Roger Arsick,  of  South-acre,  in  Norfolk,  by  whom  he  left  his  son  and  heir,  John;  and Elizabeth,  married  to  Thomas  Fotheringay,  Esq.  of  Woodrising,  in  Norfolk;  the  son resided  at  Spain's  Hall,  in  Great  Yeldham,  where,  having  married  Margery,  daughter of  John  Nanton,  Esq.  he  died  in  1495,  leaving  no  issue;  the  three  daughters  of  his sister  Elizabeth  being  his  co-heiresses:  these  were  Margaret,  wife  of  Nicholas  Beaupre, of  Norfolk;  Ellen,  of  Henry  Thorsby,  Esq.;  and  Christian,  married  to  John  de  Vere, afterwards  the  fifteenth  earl  of  Oxford.  On  the  termination  of  the  line  of  Doreward, their  extensive  possessions,  consisting  of  above  twenty  lordships  and  capital estates  in  this  county,  with  others  in  various  parts  of  the  country,  were  partitioned  out to  the  co-heiresses,  and  conveyed  to  the  families  of  Beaupre,  Thorsby,  and  Vere;  but, soon  after  the  decease  of  Margaret  Beaupre,  in  1513,  her  share  came  into  the  family of  her  sister,  Ellen  Thorsby,  and  was  the  property  of  Thomas  Thorsby,  Esq.  the  eldest son  of  Henry,  who  had  these  possessions  at  the  time  of  his  decease  in  1532.

Ankfrith,  a  Danish  nobleman,  and  the  ancestor  of  the  Thorsby  family,  flourished about  the  year  1014,  in  the  time  of  king  Sweyn,  and  had  vast  possessions  in  the northern  parts  of  the  kingdom.  They  derive  their  surname  from  a  manor  or  village in  the  north  riding  of  Yorkshire.  Of  this  family,  Edward  Thorsby,  Esq.  was  the  first who  resided  at  Dorewards  Hall,  which  he  possessed  at  the  time  of  his  decease,  in 1602,  with  a  park  and  several  parcels  of  land.  He  left,  by  his  wife  Mary,  daughter of  Philip  Bedingfield,  Esq.  Christopher,  John  and  Edward,  twins,  and  six  daughters. The  eldest  son,  Christopher,  succeeded  his  father,  and  married  Audrey,  daughter  of Nicholas  Tiperley,  Esq.  of  Hintlesham,  in  Suffolk;  he  had  by  her  William,  Henry, John,  Edward,  and  three  daughters;  and,  on  his  decease  in  1626,  was  succeeded  by William,  his  eldest  son,  who  married  Elizabeth,  daughter  of  William  Perte,  of  Middlesex, by  whom  he  had  Christopher,  William,  Edward,  Tindal,  John;  Elizabeth, Anne,  Penelope,  Mary,  and  Sarah.  Mary  was  married  to  Rice  Gwyn, Serjeant-at-law;  Philippa,  to  John  St.  John,  Esq.  of  Hatfield  Peverel;  Elizabeth,  to  Edward  Dennys,  Esq.;  Katharine,  to  John  Smith,  clerk;  and  Sarah  died  unmarried  Christopher  Thorsby,  the  eldest  son,  had  four wives,  of  whom  the  first  was  Jane,  daughter  of  Thomas  Smyth  Neville,  Esq.  of  Holt, in  Leicestershire,  by  whom  he  had  his  only  son  Thomas.  His  second  wife  was  of  a family  of  the  name  of  Dove;  but  his  two  other  wives  are  not  mentioned  by  name. In  1637,  he  sold  this  and  the  manors  of  Bradfords  and  Harries  to  Richard  Eden,  LL.D. whose  son  or  grandson  sold  them  to  John  le  Motte  Honeywood,  Esq.  of  Markshall, whose  descendants  have  retained  possession  to  the  present  time.Arms  of  Doreward  –  Ermine,  a  chevron  charged  with  three  crescentsArms  of  Thorsby  –  Argent,  a  chevron  between  three  lioncels  rampant,  sable

Owners 
Robert Thursby (d.1499) of Ashwicken and Burg's Hall, Burgess for Lynn

 Henry Thursbye (1476 – 20 September 1506), m. Helen or Ellen (b.1477), daughter and coheiress of Thomas Fedringhey and coheiress of her maternal uncle John Doreward (d.1495)
 Thomas Thursbye (1498–1532) of Bocking, Married Elizabeth or Isabel Burgoyne (d.1532+), the daughter of John Burgoyne and Margaret
 Thomas Thoresby (d.1541), who married either the daughter of Staveley or the daughter Calibutt of Castle Acre in Norfolk, or both
 Edward Thursbye of Bockinge (b.bef.1541 – 1579+) in Essex, gentleman, son and heir, m. Mary, daughter of Philip Beddingfield of Norfolk, esquire. At the death of his father, his wardship and marriage was given to his relative Edmund Beaupre. Edward Thursby's wife Mary Bedingfield was the sister of Edmund Beaupre's second wife Katherine Bedingfield. They were both the daughters of Phillip Bedingfeld of Ditchingham Hall in Norfolk
 Henry Thursby, to whom his father devised the manor of Burg's Hall in Hillington.

Current usage 
It is today a farmhouse divided into two homes, with farm buildings and 210 acres of farmland.

See also 
 Grade II* listed buildings in Braintree, Essex

References

External links 
 Braintree: Residents want to buy farm

Farmhouses
Grade II* listed buildings in Essex
Grade II* listed houses
Buildings and structures completed in the 16th century
Braintree, Essex